Brigadier Malden Augustus Studd DSO, MC, (29 September 1887 – 23 November 1973) was a British Army officer and philatelist who signed the Roll of Distinguished Philatelists in 1951. His son was Peter Malden Studd, a Lord Mayor of London.

Military career
During the first World War he was mentioned in despatches. He won the Distinguished Service Order and the Military Cross. In the latter years of his army service, Studd was aide-de-camp to King George VI.

Philately

Studd only took up philately seriously after his retirement from the Army. His first collections were of the stamps of Bechuanaland and Norway. He later specialised in Canada before moving on to the Epaulettes and Medallion issues of Belgium. He made a study of the maritime cancellations of the world and in 1970 gave a display of the Quetzal issues of Guatemala to the Royal Philatelic Society London, of which he had been a member since 1924 (Fellow 1927).

References

External links
Generals of World War II

Signatories to the Roll of Distinguished Philatelists
1887 births
1973 deaths
British philatelists
Recipients of the Military Cross
Fellows of the Royal Philatelic Society London
Royal Tank Regiment officers
Companions of the Distinguished Service Order
British Army personnel of World War I
Royal Artillery officers
British Army brigadiers of World War II